Sinum maculatum is a species of predatory sea snail, a marine gastropod mollusk in the family Naticidae, the moon snails.

Distribution

Description 

The maximum recorded shell length is 35 mm.

Habitat 
Minimum recorded depth is 0.3 m. Maximum recorded depth is 70 m.

References

External links
 

Naticidae
Gastropods described in 1831